Hamilton Town is an unincorporated community in St. Francois County, in the U.S. state of Missouri.

The community has the name of one Mr. Hamilton, a local minister.

References

Unincorporated communities in St. Francois  County, Missouri
Unincorporated communities in Missouri